Dysdera armenica is a spider species found in Armenia and Georgia.

See also 
 List of Dysderidae species

References

External links 

Dysderidae
Spiders of Europe
Fauna of Armenia
Spiders of Georgia (country)
Spiders described in 1956